Soham Wet Horse Fen is a  biological Site of Special Scientific Interest east of Soham in Cambridgeshire. A  field in the north-west corner is managed by the Wildlife Trust for Bedfordshire, Cambridgeshire and Northamptonshire as Soham Meadow.

This site is neutral grassland with diverse fauna and flora, including uncommon ones. Wetter areas have herbs such as green-winged orchids and adder’s tongue fern, and there are cowslips and stemless thistles in drier parts. snipe breed in wet pastures.

There is access to Soham Meadow by a footpath from Soham.

References

Wildlife Trust for Bedfordshire, Cambridgeshire and Northamptonshire reserves
Sites of Special Scientific Interest in Cambridgeshire
Soham